Hilltop Football Club is a football club based in Stonebridge, London, England. They are currently members of the Combined Counties League Premier Division North and groundshare with Hillingdon Borough at the Middlesex Stadium.

History
In 2005, Hilltop were formed as a club for the Somali diaspora in north west London. In 2007, the club joined the Middlesex County League Division Three. In 2010, Hilltop left the league, rejoining in 2014. In 2019, Hilltop won the Middlesex County League Division One, joining the Premier Division in the process. In 2021, the club was admitted into the Combined Counties League Division One. Hilltop entered the FA Vase for the first time in 2021–22.

Ground
The club currently groundshare with Hillingdon Borough at the Middlesex Stadium.

Honours 

 Middlesex County League
 Division One West Champions 2018–19
 Division Two Champions 2017–18
 Middlesex County FA - Junior Cup
 Champions 2018–19

Records 

 Best FA Vase performance: First Round, 2021–22

References

Somalian diaspora in the United Kingdom
Association football clubs established in 2005
2005 establishments in England
Football clubs in England
Football clubs in London
Middlesex County Football League
Combined Counties Football League
Sport in the London Borough of Brent
Sport in the London Borough of Hillingdon
Diaspora sports clubs in the United Kingdom
Diaspora association football clubs in England